Sunil Kumar Desai is an Indian film director, writer and producer, known for his work in Kannada cinema. In most of his films, Desai blends art and commercial cinema. He has written and directed suspense/thrillers and love stories. He has won the Karnataka state awards (4 times) in the Best Screenplay & Best Dialogues categories. He has also won the Filmfare awards 4 times. Desai worked with South Indian musicians like Illayaraja, Hamsalekha and Gunasingh.

Desai was born in 1955 in Bijapur, Karnataka. He had his primary education in Bijapur and higher education in Pune. He started his film-career as an assistant to Kashinath, and later Suresh Heblikar.

Career
Desai made film debut as a director with Tarka in 1989.  He subsequent films Nishkarsha, Beladingala Baale and Nammoora Mandara Hoove earned him a reputation as the most innovative and influential directors of the 1990s. After three years of absence, Desai had announced that he have four films up his sleeve one of which is due at the end of 2019.

Filmography

References

External links

Kannada film directors
People from Bijapur, Karnataka
1955 births
Living people
Filmfare Awards South winners
Film directors from Karnataka
20th-century Indian film directors
21st-century Indian film directors
Screenwriters from Karnataka
Film producers from Karnataka
Kannada film producers
Kannada screenwriters